Pelonaia is a genus of ascidian tunicates in the family Styelidae.

Species within the genus Pelonaia include:
 Pelonaia corrugata Goodsir & Forbes, 1841 
 Pelonaia quadrivena Monniot, 2011

Species names currently considered to be synonyms:
 Pelonaia arenifera Stimpson, 1851: synonym of Pelonaia corrugata Goodsir & Forbes, 1841 
 Pelonaia glabra Forbes & Goodsir, 1841: synonym of Pelonaia corrugata Goodsir & Forbes, 1841 
 Pelonaia villosa Sars, 1859: synonym of Pelonaia corrugata Goodsir & Forbes, 1841

References

Stolidobranchia
Tunicate genera